Jennings Run (Garrett County) and Jennings Run (Allegany County) are Maryland tributaries to Three Forks Run and Wills Creek, respectively.

Jennings Run (Allegany County) begins near Frostburg. Mount Savage Run joins Jennings Run at Mount Savage, and another small creek beginning near Wellersburg adds its waters to Jennings Run at Barrelville. Jennings Run continues to Corriganville, where it merges with Wills Creek.

References

Rivers of Maryland